The 1979 PGA Championship was the 61st PGA Championship, played August 2–5 at Oakland Hills Country Club in Bloomfield Township, Michigan, a suburb northwest of Detroit. After a double-bogey on the 72nd hole, David Graham won the first of his two major titles on the third hole of a sudden-death playoff with Ben Crenshaw. Through 17 holes in the final round, Graham was seven-under, with seven birdies and ten pars. Of the 21 holes he played Sunday, nine were birdies.

After 54 holes, Rex Caldwell was the leader at 203 (−7), Crenshaw was two strokes back and Graham four behind at 207 (−3), all in search of their first major title. It was the fifth runner-up finish for Crenshaw in a major, and second consecutive. He later won two majors, both at the Masters, in 1984 and 1995; Graham won his second at the U.S. Open in 1981 at Merion.

Three-time champion Sam Snead set the record for the oldest player to make the cut in a major.  He was 67 years, 2 months, and 7 days of age at the cut and finished 42nd at 288 (+8). He won in 1942, 1949, and 1951, all in match play.

It was the sixth major championship held on the South Course, which previously hosted the PGA Championship in 1972 and the U.S. Open in 1924, 1937, 1951, and 1961. It later hosted the U.S. Open in 1985 and 1996, the PGA Championship in 2008, and the Ryder Cup in 2004.

This was the third consecutive playoff at the PGA Championship (and nearly the fourth, as the 1976 title was decided by the final putt on the 72nd green).

Graham became the second Australian-born player to win the PGA Championship, preceded by Jim Ferrier in 1947.

Jerry Pate and Tom Watson, runners-up in the previous year's playoff, were tied with Graham in third place after 54 holes. Pate's 71 tied for fifth but Watson's 74 dropped him into a tie for twelfth at 281. Watson had won three of his eight majors at this time, but never completed the career grand slam, missing the PGA Championship leg. Defending champion John Mahaffey tied for 51st.

This was the final major championship of the 1970s. Jack Nicklaus and Tom Weiskopf played in the event assuring that they played in every major championship in the 1970s. They were the first players to play in every major championship for an entire decade.

Past champions in the field

Made the cut

Missed the cut 

Source

Round summaries

First round
Thursday, August 2, 1979

Source:

Second round
Friday, August 3, 1979

Source:

Third round
Saturday, August 4, 1979

Source:

Final round
Sunday, August 5, 1979

Source:

Scorecard

Final round

Cumulative tournament scores, relative to par

Playoff
At the par-5 second hole, Crenshaw tapped in for birdie while Graham sank a ten-footer (3 m) to continue. He won with a birdie on the  par-3 third hole, after Crenshaw found a bunker and his  putt for par lipped out. Graham put his 4-iron tee shot to within  and with two putts to win, sank the first.

Scorecard

References

External links

PGA.com – 1979 PGA Championship

PGA Championship
Golf in Michigan
Bloomfield Hills, Michigan
PGA Championship
PGA Championship
PGA Championship
PGA Championship